James Walter Grimston, 4th Earl of Verulam (17 April 1880 – 29 November 1949) was a British peer, electrical engineer and businessman, sometimes identified with the fringes of the intelligence service.

Verulam was the son of James Grimston, 3rd Earl of Verulam, and Margaret Frances Graham. He married Lady Violet Constance Maitland Brabazon (1886–1936), younger daughter of Reginald Brabazon, 12th Earl of Meath.

He founded Enfield Cables Ltd and had many business interests in oil and telecommunications, including as a director of British Thomson-Houston. He reputedly allowed MI6 the use of some of the premises on his estate and was a business associate and personal friend of World War II internee Robert Liversidge.

Verulam died in November 1949, and was succeeded in his titles by his son, James Brabazon Grimston.

References

Bibliography

Kidd, Charles, Williamson, David (editors). Debrett's Peerage and Baronetage (1990 edition). New York: St Martin's Press, 1990.

1880 births
1949 deaths
4
James
British electrical engineers
20th-century British businesspeople